Henri de Solages (21 August 1786 – 8 December 1832) was a French Catholic missionary who advocated for missionary work in the Pacific.  In 1829, he was named apostolic prefect to Réunion island.  The next year he was named prefect of a very large geographic area in the South Pacific.

He was tortured and killed in Andevoranto, Madagascar in 1832.

References

1786 births
1832 deaths
19th-century French Roman Catholic priests
Apostolic prefects
French Roman Catholic missionaries
Roman Catholic missionaries in Madagascar
French expatriates in Madagascar
Roman Catholic missionaries in Réunion